The Alexandre Dumas Museum opened in 1905 in Villers-Cotterêts in the commune of Aisne, France, where Thomas-Alexandre Davy de la Pailleterie, father of the writer Alexandre Dumas and grandfather of Alexandre Dumas fils, academician, died in 1806. The museum was named a Musée de France in 2002.

The museum is one of the various sites in the city which recall the link between Villers-Cotterêts and the Dumas family: the royal château François 1er, the Saint-Nicolas church, the town hall, the Hôtel de l'Épée, the Abbé-Grégoire college or the family house.

History 
It was in 1902, on the occasion of the centenary of Alexandre Dumas's birth in the city that the municipality decided to gather and display all the memories linked to the Dumas family in the city. The creation and management of this project were given to the Regional Historical Society of Villers-Cotterêts. The museum then opened in 1905. at 13 rue Demoustier.

During years, the museum is growing and moving. During the First World War, in order to protect the collections from the war, it was moved to Dijon.

In 1932, the museum reopened at the Dauphin Hotel. It is also the year of the creation of the Alexandre Dumas Friends Society to support and develop the museum.

In 1952, the museum moved to a 19th century mansion that served as General Maunoury's headquarters during the First World War.

The museum has three rooms, each of them dedicated to one of the family members:

Collections 
The museum collections evoke the three Dumas, the general born in the Antilles and a slave, the author of the Count of Monte Cristo and the academician. They bring together numerous portraits, personal objects, documents written by the Dumas family.

Numerous manuscripts by Dumas Père adorn the museum: travel accounts, drafts of novels, children's stories, his memoirs, etc.

The museum also hosts many art pieces on the three men signed by famous artists: Louis Boulanger, Eugène Giraud, Albert-Ernest Carrier-Belleuse, Jules Franceschi, Edouard Dubufe, Jules Lefèvre, Jules Machard, Alphonse de Moncel, etc.

The museum organizes activities around events, museum nights, themed evenings, temporary exhibitions, etc.

Pictures

References

External links 
 Museum collection on French officialmuseums database
 Museum website
 Museum page on Musenor website
 Office du soissonnais
 Actualité Littéraire article

Alexandre Dumas
Museums in Aisne